Conor McCarthy (born 11 April 1998) is an Irish professional footballer who plays as a defender for English club Barnsley. He has previously played for Cork City and St Mirren.

Club career
A Blarney native, McCarthy began his career with local club Blarney United, before signing for Cork City. Whilst playing for Cork's under-19 team, McCarthy captained Cork to a 1–0 UEFA Youth League win over HJK Helsinki - the first victory by an Irish club in the competition's history. McCarthy signed for Scottish club St Mirren in January 2020.

In June 2022 it was announced that he would sign for English club Barnsley on 1 July 2022, signing a three-year contract.

International career
McCarthy has represented the Republic of Ireland at under-18 and under-21 level.

Career statistics

References

1998 births
Living people
Republic of Ireland association footballers
Association footballers from County Cork
Cork City F.C. players
St Mirren F.C. players
League of Ireland players
Scottish Professional Football League players
Association football defenders
Republic of Ireland youth international footballers
Republic of Ireland under-21 international footballers
Republic of Ireland expatriate association footballers
Irish expatriate sportspeople in Scotland
Expatriate footballers in Scotland
English Football League players